The following is a list of mayors and presidents of the city of Łódź, Poland.

List of mayors

Prior to 1815
 Jan Dąbrowski, 1471-1480
 Stanisław Kaleta, 1480-1488
 Jan Dąbrowski, 1488-1504
 Mikołaj Jagiełka, 1504-1504
 Jakub Dąbrowa, 1504-1507
 Stanisław Kalata, 1507-1508
 Grzegorz Wyszek, 1509-1517
 Wawrzyniec Dąbrowski, 1518-1525
 Jan Smarzewski, 1526-1526
 Mikołaj Kochan, 1527-1532
 Wojciech Wyszek, 1532-1546
 Mikołaj Kochan, 1546-1548
 Jakub Polczyk, 1548-1549
 Mikołaj Domagała, 1550-1550
 Marcin Świgonia, 1551-1552
 Walenty Kupski, 1552-1558
 Marcin Świgonia, 1558-1559
 Mikołaj Domagała, 1560-1572
 Klimek Doczekała, 1573-1584
 Bartosz Domagała, 1602-1603
 Wojciech Stanek, 1603-1608
 Mikołaj Kasprzyk, 1608-1612
 Wojciech Stanek, 1612-1613
 Hipolit, 1613-1616
 Jan Jałocha, 1616-1617
 Wawrzyniec Michałowski, 1618-1621
 Jakub Ciupka, 1621-1625
 Wawrzyniec Michałowski, 1625-1628
 Jan Jałocha, 1628-1632
 Paweł Markowicz, 1632-1636
 Jan Rozwora, 1636-1639
 Wawrzyniec Michałowicz, 1639-1640
 Błażej Ferens, 1640-1643
 Jan Jałocha, 1644-1645
 Andrzej Pawłowicz, 1645-1647
 Ambroży Śmiały, 1647-1651
 Marcin Jałochowicz, 1651-1653
 Paweł Makowicz, 1653-1656
 Błażej Ferens, 1656-1657
 Wojciech Piątkowicz, 1657-1661
 Jan Markowicz, 1661-1665
 Jan Rozwora, 1665-1666
 Jan Markowicz, 1666-1679
 Wojciech Lewik vel. Lewicki, 1679-1688
 Jakub Suwała, 1688-1691
 Adam Ślusarz vel. Kałuziński, 1691-1696
 Stanisław Kulig, 1697-1698
 Adam Kałuziński, 1698-1699
 Aleksy Ostoja, 1700-1700
 Grzegorz Pełzowicz, 1700-1708
 Adam Kałuziński, 1708-1708
 Wojciehc Kozula, 1709-1709
 Adam Markowicz, 1710-1710
 Błażej Krzysztofkowicz, 1712-1715
 Kazimierz Pełzowicz, 1717-1717
 Adam Markowicz, 1719-1719
 Kazimierz Pełzowicz, 1719-1720
 Grzegorz Markowicz, 1720-1720
 Błażej Krzysztofkowicz, 1721-1723
 Józef Zakrzewicz, 1723-1727
 Błażej Krzysztofkowicz, 1727-1730
 Andrzej Drewnowicz, 1730-1732
 Wojciech Gozdowski, 1732-1733
 Andrzej Drewnowicz, 1734-1736
 Wojciech Gozdrowki, 1736-1736
 Grzegorz Kozula, 1736-1737
 Józef Zakrzewicz, 1737-1738
 Błażej Krzysztofkowicz, 1738-1739
 Antoni Kielam, 1740-1743
 Idzi Głowiński, 1743-1745
 Antoni Kielam, 1746-1748
 Wojciech Głowiński, 1748-1748
 Felicjan Zawacki, 1748-1749
 Antoni Kielam, 1749-1750
 Mikołaj Domaniewicz, 1750-1752
 Józef Drewnowicz, 1752-1752
 Józef Drewnowicz, 1753-1754
 Józef Drewnowicz, 1754-1756
 Antoni Kielam, 1760-1760
 Wojciech Głowiński, 1761-1761
 Felicjan Zawacki, 1761-1762
 Jan Gozdowski, 1762-1763
 Felicjan Zawacki, 1763-1764
 Mikołaj Domaniewicz, 1764-1765
 Felicjan Zawacki, 1766-1767
 Józef Michałkowicz, 1767-1771
 Jan Maniński, 1771-1771
 Jan Gozdowski, 1772-1773
 Józef Michałkowicz, 1773-1773
 Paweł Suwała, 1774-1774
 Jan Maniński, 1775-1777
 , 1775-1777
 Jakub Krzysztofarski, 1777-1779
 Aleksy Drewnowicz, 1779-1781
 Józef Witoński, 1782-1783
 Józef Michałkowicz, 1783-1785
 Aleksy Drewnowicz, 1785-1786
 Piotr Drewnowicz, 1786-1788
 Jan Jeżewicz, 1788-1789
 Błażej Jugowicz, 1790-1791
 Jan Pełzowski, 1791-1792
 Piotr Zakrzewicz, 1792-1793
 Michał Kuzitowicz, 1793-1794
 Piotr Drewnowicz, 1794-1794
 Józef Aufschlag, 1800-1805
 Tomasz Jeżewicz, 1806-1806
 Piotr Drewnowicz, 1807-1807
 W Dąbkowski, 1808-1808
 Antoni Czaykowski, 1809-1810

1815-1919
 Szymon Szczawiński, 1815-1819
 W Dąbkowski, 1815-1815
 Antoni Czaykowski, 1815-1815
 Szymon Szczawiński, 1815-1819
 Antoni Czarkowski, 1819-1820
 Karol Tangermann, 1826-1829
 Teodor Duczyński, 1830-1831
 Karol Tangermann, 1831-1841
 Franciszek Traeger, 1844-1862
 Andrzej Rosicki, 1862-1865
 Edmund Pohlens, 1865-1869
 Maurycy Taubwurcel vel. Taubworcel, 1869-1878
 Walerian Michał Makowiecki, 1878-1882
 , 1882-1914
 Alfred Biedermann, 1914-1914
 Antoni Staromirski, 1914-1915
 Heinrich Schoppen, 1915-1917
 Leopold Skulski, 1917-1919

1919-1989
 , 1919–1923
 , 1923–1927
 , 1927–1927
 , 1927–1933
 Wacław Maksymilian Józef Wojewódzki, 1933–1935
 , 1935–1936
 , 1936–1939
 , 1939–1939
 Kazimierz Tomczak, 1939–1939
 , 1939–1939
 , 1940–1940
 , 1940–1941
 , 1941–1943
 Otto Bradfisch, 1943–1944
 , 1944–1945
 , 1945–1945
 Kazimierz Mijal, 1945–1947
 , 1947–1949
 , 1949–1950
 , 1952–1954
 , 1954–1956
 , 1956–1971
 , 1971–1973
 , 1978–1985
 , 1985–1989

Since 1989
 Waldemar Bohdanowicz, 1989-1990
 Grzegorz Palka, 1990-1994
 Marek Czekalski, 1994-1998
 Tadeusz Matusiak, 1998-2001
 Krzysztof Panas, 2001-2002
 Krzysztof Jagiełło, 2002-2002
 Jerzy Kropiwnicki, 2002-2010
 Tomasz Sadzyński, 2010-2010
 Paweł Paczkowski, 2010-2010
 Hanna Zdanowska, 2010-

See also
 Timeline of Łódź

References

This article incorporates information from the Polish Wikipedia.